Wilder Zabala (born 31 December 1982) is a Bolivian international footballer who plays for Oriente Petrolero, as a defender.

Club career
Zabala has played for Real Potosí, Blooming and Oriente Petrolero.

International career
He made his international debut for Bolivia in 2009, and has played in FIFA World Cup qualifying matches.

Personal life
Zabala is the uncle of the Bolivian international footballer Leonardo Zabala.

References

1982 births
Living people
Sportspeople from Santa Cruz de la Sierra
Bolivian footballers
Bolivia international footballers
Club Blooming players
Oriente Petrolero players
Association football defenders